Pogwizdów Nowy  is a district of Rzeszów, Poland, located in the northern part of the city.

It was included within the city limits of Rzeszów on 1 January 2021. Earlier, it was a separate village, located in the administrative district of Gmina Głogów Małopolski, within Rzeszów County, Subcarpathian Voivodeship.

References

Rzeszów
Neighbourhoods in Poland